Cotana kebeae is a moth in the family Eupterotidae. It was described by George Thomas Bethune-Baker in 1904. It is found in New Guinea.

The wingspan is 48–56 mm. The forewings are cinnamon brown, but paler in the medial area and with a straight oblique dark purplish-brown medial stripe, followed by a slightly curved narrower similar coloured postmedial line edged with paler externally. In this edging is a row of dark dots on each vein. The apex has a darker suffusion. The hindwings are orange, with a trace of a medial line and a suffused lunulated postmedial stripe which is edged with pale externally. There is a row of dark dots on the veins.

Subspecies
Cotana kebeae kebeae
Cotana kebeae grandis Rothschild, 1917

References

Moths described in 1904
Bombycoidea